Danielle Rose Russell (born October 31, 1999) is an American actress. She is known for her role as Hope Mikaelson in the fifth and final season of The CW supernatural drama series The Originals and as the star of the spinoff series, Legacies, which premiered on October 25, 2018, and aired four seasons, ending on June 16, 2022. She also has played supporting roles in films such as A Walk Among the Tombstones (2014), Aloha (2015), Pandemic (2016), and Wonder (2017).

Early life
Russell was born in Pequannock Township, New Jersey, and raised in West Milford, New Jersey. She is the daughter of Rosemary Rado, a former dancer and Rockette, and Ricky Russell, a former singer. She initially pursued modeling in her youth, appearing in print ads and commercials, before pursuing regional theater and appearing in several school plays at Holy Spirit School in Pequannock, New Jersey. , she was finishing high school via online coursework.

Career
Russell's first role was in the film A Walk Among the Tombstones (2014), playing the 14-year-old daughter of a Russian drug dealer. The next year, she appeared in Aloha (2015), as the daughter of Bradley Cooper's character. In 2016, Russell appeared in six episodes of the short lived TV series The Last Tycoon. Russell played a supporting role in the 2017 film Wonder.

In July 2017, she was cast as the teenage Hope Mikaelson in the fifth and final season of The CW television series The Originals. In May 2018, it was reported that she would continue her role as Hope Mikaelson on The CW's Legacies, a spinoff of The Originals. She was nominated for Teen Choice Award for Choice Sci-Fi/Fantasy TV Actress in 2019 for the role. Russell continued on Legacies for four seasons, with the series concluding on June 16, 2022.

Filmography

References

External links
 
 
 

1999 births
21st-century American actresses
American female models
American film actresses
American stage actresses
American television actresses
Living people
People from Pequannock Township, New Jersey
People from West Milford, New Jersey
Actresses from New Jersey
Female models from New Jersey